Bidorpitia ceramica is a species of moth of the family Tortricidae. It is found in Ecuador (Morona-Santiago Province and Napo Province).

The ground colour of the forewings is cream ferruginous, suffused and strigulated with rust. The markings are rust. The hindwings are cream to the middle and pale ochreous orange on the periphery.

Etymology
The species name refers to the colouration of the forewings and is derived from Latin ceramia (meaning red coloured).

References

Moths described in 2006
Endemic fauna of Ecuador
Euliini
Moths of South America
Taxa named by Józef Razowski